Upton Magna is a civil parish in Shropshire, England.  It contains 22 listed buildings that are recorded in the National Heritage List for England.  Of these, two are listed at Grade II*, the middle of the three grades, and the others are at Grade II, the lowest grade.  The parish contains the village of Upton Magna and is otherwise rural.  The Shrewsbury Branch of the Shropshire Union Canal ran through the parish.  It is now disused but three structures associated with it have been listed, namely a bridge and the entrances to a tunnel.  In the village, most of the listed buildings are houses, cottages and associated structures, the earliest of these are timber framed.  Also in the village and listed are a church and items in the churchyard.  Outside the village, the other listed buildings include farmhouses and associated structures, a house and cottages.


Key

Buildings

References

Citations

Sources

Lists of buildings and structures in Shropshire